Chuqi Pirwa (Aymara chuqi gold, pirwa, piwra granary, Quechua chuqi,  metal, every kind of precious metal; gold (<Aymara), pirwa deposit, "gold granary" or "metal deposit", Hispanicized spelling Choquepirhua) is a mountain in the Andes of Peru, about  high. It is situated in the Cusco Region, Espinar Province, Condoroma District, and in the Puno Region, Lampa Province, Ocuviri District. Chuqi Pirwa lies southwest of Sawanani Lake (Saguanani) and northwest of Qullqi Q'awa.

References

Mountains of Cusco Region
Mountains of Puno Region
Mountains of Peru